NEST may refer to:
National Employment Savings Trust, a British workplace pension scheme
National Entrance Screening Test, an Indian college entrance examination
National Training Institute of Education, Science and Technology, a Korean training institute
Near East School of Theology, a theological seminary in Beirut, Lebanon
NEST (software), a neural simulation tool
Nonbiological Extraterrestrial Species Treaty, a fictional military alliance in Transformers: Revenge of the Fallen
Northland Emergency Services Trust, a New Zealand emergency rescue organisation
Novell Embedded Systems Technology, a software product for embedded systems
Nuclear Emergency Support Team, a radiological incident response group

See also
 Nest, a structure built by animals for holding eggs
 Nest (disambiguation)